Mahnaz Angury (born c.1998) is an Afghan-born Australian journalist. She is currently a television reporter for the Australian Broadcasting Corporation.

Early life 
Angury was born in Jaghuri, Ghazni, Afghanistan. Her family were members of the persecuted minority Hazara community. Angury's father, Hafizullah, fled Afghanistan by boat in 1998, before Angury was born, because his advocacy on behalf of the Hazaras had put him in danger from the ruling Taliban. After spending seven months in a detention centre, Hafizullah was eventually granted asylum in Australia. In 2004, he sponsored his wife and three children (Angury and an older brother and sister) to join him in Australia. Angury's parents subsequently had two more boys.

Angury completed her Higher School Certificate at Sefton High School. She went on to achieve a Bachelor of Media in 2018 and a Master of Journalism and Communication in 2019, both from the University of New South Wales.

Career 
Angury's early roles included writing for Dolly, GQ, Fashion Industry Broadcast and the Daily Mail, and working as an interpreter for NAATI.

In 2019, Angury joined the Australian Broadcasting Corporation (ABC), initially as a news producer, and then as a reporter for ABC Riverina. She is currently a reporter for ABC News, based in Sydney.

In 2022, Angury appeared as a guest on The Cook Up with Adam Liaw.

References 

1990s births
Living people
Hazara people
Australian journalists
Australian Muslims